The Electric Short Line Railway, also known as Luce Electric Lines, was a railroad that operated in Minnesota, originating in Minneapolis and heading westward.  The railroad owes its nickname to the fact it was operated by members of the Luce family.  The railroad ultimately reached beyond Clara City to Gluek.  Today, the line has mostly been abandoned, but its former right-of-way now hosts the Luce Line State Trail operated by the Minnesota Department of Natural Resources. The Luce Line Regional Trail operated by the Three Rivers Park District connects to the state trail, but runs on roads and paths that roughly parallel what remains of the Luce Electric Lines.

The Electric Short Line Railway and the affiliated Electric Short Line Railroad (later renamed the Electric Short Line Terminal Co.) were incorporated in late 1908.  Construction started in 1909, but it took until 1913 for the first 3.2 miles to be completed from 3rd Avenue and 7th Street North (construction was in various stages of completion for the next 30 miles, however).  That spot was originally known as Boagen Green, then became Luce Line Junction when the Dan Patch Line reached it.  It eventually became known as Glenwood Junction.  Rail east of that point was owned by the ESL Terminal Co., while rail to the west was owned by the ESL Railway.  17.8 miles were complete by mid-1914, 47.5 by mid-1915, and 70.9 miles by the end of 1917 (although some of this included double-tracking), reaching Hutchinson.

Backers of the line had originally planned to reach Brookings, South Dakota, and construction westward resumed in 1922 with completion to Cosmos and extension to Lake Lillian the following year.  However, the railroad fell into foreclosure in 1924, and the Electric Short Line Railway came under the control of the Minnesota Western Railroad (later known as the Minneapolis Industrial Railway), which had been formed by the ESL Railway's bondholders. The Luce family lost control of the company when it was purchased by Minneapolis, Northfield & Southern in 1927. MN&S predecessor Dan Patch Lines had a very early relationship with the Luce Line having built a connection to the Luce Line from Auto Club in Bloomington to Glenwood Junction in Golden Valley in 1915, and had used the track from Glenwood Junction to the terminal in Minneapolis for many years. After Dan Patch ceased operations in 1916, the organization of the MN&S in 1918 helped secure the Luce Line profitability as MN&S became a very important beltline allowing inbound shipments to Minneapolis to avoid the crowded railyards between St Paul and Minneapolis.

Despite the "Electric Short Line" name, the railroad never operated electric locomotives. Passenger service used gasoline-electric railcars manufactured by General Electric and Wason Car Company, though one gasoline-mechanical McKeen Motor Car Company railcar also saw use.  The railcars often towed extra passenger cars as trailers.  Freight trains were pulled by steam locomotives.

The Minnesota Western Railway continued to operate passenger service into the late 1940s, but was reduced to just one passenger railcar by the end of 1942. Passenger service finally ended in 1947.
  
The Minnesota Western Railway was acquired by the Minneapolis and St. Louis Railway in 1956 and was renamed the Minneapolis Industrial Railway in September of 1959. M&StL came under control of the Chicago and North Western Railway on November 1, 1960. The MW subesquently saw deferred maintenance and reduced service as the C&NW sought to abandon the line. In 1967, C&NW asked the Minnesota Railroad and Warehouse Commission for permission to abandon the Gluek to Hutchinson segment. Protests against abandonment were logged, but C&NW tore up the line almost immediately after the MRWC approved abandonment. Two years later, the C&NW was back before the MRWC to ask permission to abandon the line from Hutchinson to Plymouth, Minnesota. The MRWC approved the abandonment, and by mid-1970, 104 miles of the former Luce Line had been removed between Hutchinson and Plymouth. Chicago and North Western was merged into the Union Pacific Railroad in 1995, and the remnants of the Luce Line between Interstate 494 and downtown Minneapolis are now operated as the UP's Golden Valley Industrial Lead.

References

Interurban railways in Minnesota
Railway companies established in 1908
Railway companies established in 1924
Railway companies disestablished in 1955
Railway companies disestablished in 1956
Defunct Minnesota railroads
1908 establishments in Minnesota
1956 disestablishments in Minnesota
American companies established in 1924